Marina Perzy (born 30 August 1955) is an Italian radio and television presenter, showgirl, actress, writer and television author.

Life and career 
Born in Milan, Perzy made her debut in 1978, as an assistant of Corrado in the RAI television show Domenica in. She hosted a large number of radio and television programs, notably the long-running sport talk-show La Domenica Sportiva. She also starred on several comedy plays, and appeared in a number of films and TV-series. In the mid-1980s she was a protagonist of gossip columns for a sentimental relationship with footballer Walter Zenga.

References

External links 
  
 

1955 births
Actresses from Milan
Living people
Italian television personalities
Italian film actresses
Italian television actresses
Italian stage actresses